ProMedica Bixby Hospital (formerly Bixby Medical Center) was a public hospital in Adrian, Michigan that is part of the ProMedica Health System. It was replaced in 2020 with Charles and Virginia Hickman Hospital. The new hospital also replaced Herrick Medical Center in Tecumseh.

References

External links
ProMedica Bixby Hospital

Hospitals in Michigan